Corona perversa is a species of air-breathing land snail, a terrestrial pulmonate gastropod mollusk in the family Orthalicidae. 

The shell of Corona perversa is normally left-handed or sinistral. This species lives in Brazil.

References

 Simone, L. R. L. (2006). Land and Freshwater Molluscs of Brazil. Editora Grafíca Bernardi, FAPESP. São Paulo, 390 pp.
 Massemin D., Lamy D., Pointier J.P. & Gargominy O. (2009). Coquillages et escargots de Guyane. Mèze: Biotope. 456 pp

Orthalicidae
Gastropods described in 1820
Taxa named by William John Swainson
Molluscs of Brazil